Sagaing District  is an administrative district in southern Sagaing Division,  Burma (Myanmar).  Its administrative center is the city of Sagaing.

Townships

Sagaing District consists of the following townships:
Myaung Township 
Myinmu Township 
Sagaing Township

Notes

Districts of Myanmar
Sagaing Region